The Central Arizona Valley Institute of Technology (CAVIT) is a joint technological education district in Pinal County, Arizona, based in Coolidge. It was founded in 2001.

Member high schools
Casa Grande Union High School
Coolidge High School
Florence High School
Maricopa High School
Poston Butte High School
Santa Cruz Valley Union High School
San Tan Foothills High School
Vista Grande High School

External links
Official website

School districts in Arizona
2001 establishments in Arizona
School districts established in 2001